was a women's football team which played in Division 1 of Japan's Nadeshiko League. It founded the league back in 1994. The club was disbanded in 2008.

Results

Transition of team name 
Urawa Motobuto Ladies FC : 1980–1993
Urawa Ladies FC : 1994–1997
Urawa Motobuto Ladies FC : 1998–2008

References

External links 
Japanese women's club teams

Women's football clubs in Japan
1976 establishments in Japan
Sports teams in Saitama (city)